Dumitru Alaiba (born 14 April 1982) is a Moldovan economist and politician. He currently serves as Deputy Prime Minister and Minister of Economic Development and Digitalization in the Recean Cabinet.

References

Living people
1982 births
Government ministers of Moldova
Moldovan economists
21st-century Moldovan politicians
Members of the parliament of Moldova